Gonfreville-l'Orcher is a commune in the Seine-Maritime department in the Normandy region in northern France.

Geography
The A131 autoroute cuts through the middle of the commune alongside the banks of the Tancarville canal.
The economy depends mainly on the industrial area of the Port of the Lower-Seine (chemical works and refineries) and the commercial area known as Camp-Dolent.

History
The etymology of the first part of the name is Gunfridr's farm, a Scandinavian farmer who probably settled in the 10th century.

The Orcher suffix comes from the name of the first seigneurs of the village, now corrupted to Orcher, but originally Aurichier (alor = alder and kjarr / ker = marsh. Cf. Ellerker, Yorkshire), that took themselves in turn their name from the same place, where the chateau is located.

The commune was created and recorded in 1251 with the merger of the two parishes of Gonfreville and Gournay. A priory had stood here since 1024 but long before that, Bronze Age people had been here, witnessed by the tools unearthed during the 19th century and the name Gournay is a Celtic archetype *Gornako, connected with a wet place.

Heraldry

Population

Places of interest
 The church of St. Erconwald, dating from the nineteenth century.
 The remains of a feudal motte.
 The eighteenth century château d'Orcher
 Vestiges of the medieval castle d'Orcher in the park of the present-day chateau.
 The Renaissance manorhouse de Bévilliers (sixteenth century).
 The church of Notre-Dame, dating from the seventeenth century.
 The chapel at Dignefort, dating from the thirteenth century (Now a private house).
 A fifteenth century dovecote.

See also
Communes of the Seine-Maritime department

References

External links

 Official town website 
 Audiovisual website about Gonfreville l'Orcher 

Communes of Seine-Maritime
Seine-Maritime communes articles needing translation from French Wikipedia